Shelovskaya is a rural locality (a village) in Spasskoye Rural Settlement, Tarnogsky District, Vologda Oblast, Russia. The population was 37 as of 2002.

Geography 
Shelovskaya is located 46 km northwest of Tarnogsky Gorodok (the district's administrative centre) by road. Vanevskaya is the nearest rural locality.

References 

Rural localities in Tarnogsky District